Chittenden is the primary village and a census-designated place (CDP) in the town of Chittenden, Rutland County, Vermont, United States. As of the 2020 census, it had a population of 136, out of 1,237 in the entire town.

The CDP is in northeastern Rutland County, in the southwest part of the town. It sits at the western foot of the Green Mountains, in the valley of East Creek, which flows south through Rutland to join Otter Creek, a north-flowing tributary of Lake Champlain.

The village is served by East Pittsford-Chittenden Road, which leads south  to East Pittsford.

References 

Populated places in Rutland County, Vermont
Census-designated places in Rutland County, Vermont
Census-designated places in Vermont